Fou may refer to:

People 
 Fou Fonoti (born 1991), American football player
 Fou Ts'ong (born 1934), Chinese pianist
 Pama Fou (born 1990), Australian rugby union player

Other uses 
 Fou (instrument) (缻), an ancient Chinese percussion instrument
 Fou (album), by French progressive rock band Ange

See also
 Le Fou (disambiguation)
 Folle blanche, a wine grape
 Fougamou Airport, in Gabon